Roarback Brook begins on the eastern side of Vly Mountain and travels east, passing to the south of Vinegar Hill before converging with West Kill west-southwest of  Lexington, New York.

References 

Rivers of New York (state)
Rivers of Greene County, New York